Halsbury's Laws of England is a uniquely comprehensive encyclopaedia of law, and provides the only complete narrative statement of law in England and Wales. It has an alphabetised title scheme covering all areas of law, drawing on authorities including Acts of Parliament of the United Kingdom, Measures of the Welsh Assembly, UK case law and European law. It is written by or in consultation with experts in the relevant field.

Halsbury's Laws has an annual and monthly updating service. The encyclopaedia and updates are available in both hard copy and online, with some content available for free online.

History

In 1907 Stanley Shaw Bond, editor at Butterworths, began a project to produce a complete statement of the law of England and Wales that was authoritative, comprehensive and up-to-date. Bond tracked down the former Lord Chancellor, The Earl of Halsbury, on holiday in Nice to invite him to be the editor-in-chief of The Laws of England.

Traditionally, the role of editor-in-chief of Halsbury's Laws is held by a former Lord Chancellor, and the current incumbent is Lord Mackay of Clashfern.

In 2007, Halsbury's Laws celebrated its centenary with an evening of seminars led by Lord Mackay of Clashfern and professor Richard Susskind, and the publication of a collection of centenary essays.

First edition

The first edition was published in 31 volumes from 1907 to 1917. Since then, new editions have been launched at intervals of about 20 to 30 years.

Volume 1 was published in 1907. Its articles run from action to bankers and banking. The volume deals with action, admiralty, agency, agriculture, aliens, allotments, animals, arbitration, auction, bailment and bankers and banking.

Volume 2 was published in 1908. Its articles run from bankruptcy to bills of exchange. It contains but four treatises, upon bankruptcy and insolvency (335 pages), barristers (67 pages), bastardy (28 pages) and bills of exchange, promissory notes and negotiable instruments (124 pages).

Volume 5 (companies) is devoted entirely to company law, and forms a treatise of 768 pages on that subject. After a general consideration of the nature and domicile of companies, the work considers briefly the history of company legislation. Then follows an elaborate treatise on the Companies Act 1908. Special companies, like banking, insurance and public service companies, are considered; as well as chartered companies, the livery companies of the City of London, quasi-corporations, and illegal companies; and a few pages are devoted to foreign companies. The reviewer in the Harvard Law Review thought the table of cases cited must contain at least five thousand cases. He said the importance of this treatise was at once apparent; and that to the commercial lawyer in the Eastern cities of the United States it would be exceedingly useful.

The articles in volume 11 run from descent to ecclesiastical law. It contains a short article on descent and distribution; a discussion of discovery, inspection and interrogatories, under the English practice; an elaborate article on distress; an article on easements and profits, which the Harvard Law Review said was the most interesting article in the volume to an American lawyer; and an elaborate disquisition on ecclesiastical law.

The articles in volume 12 run from education to electric lighting and power. The Harvard Law Review said that the articles on education and elections had comparatively little value to the American bar, but the hundred pages devoted to electric lighting and power were useful.

Volume 20 was published in 1911. Its articles run from markets to misrepresentation. It contains articles on markets and fairs (59 pages), master and servant (221 pages), medicine and pharmacy (82 pages), the Metropolis (106 pages), mines, minerals and quarries (156 pages) and misrepresentation and fraud (110 pages). According to the Harvard Law Review, the article on master and servant was of constant interest to an American lawyer; and that on misrepresentation and fraud, from the master hand of G. Spencer Bower, was a valuable treatise in itself.
   
Volume 21 was published in 1912. Its articles run from mistake to partition. It contains articles on mistake (34 pages), money and money lending (29 pages), mortgage (283 pages), negligence (134 pages), notaries (9 pages), nuisance (72 pages), Parliament (197 pages) and partition (59 pages). The Harvard Law Review said that the standard set by the preceding volumes appeared to be maintained and that the series, up to this volume, was a collection of very admirable treatises on English law.

Second, third and fourth editions
The second edition was published in 37 volumes from 1932 to 1941. The editor-in-chief was Viscount Hailsham. The managing editor was Sir Roland Burrows. The second edition of volume 5 was published in 1949. The second and subsequent editions of the encyclopaedia took the name of the said Earl of Halsbury.

The third edition was published in 43 volumes from 1952 to 1964. The general editor was Lord Simonds.

The fourth edition was published in 56 volumes from 1973 to 1987. The editor-in-chief was Lord Hailsham of St Marylebone. The editor-in-chief of volumes reissued from August 1998 onwards was Lord Mackay of Clashfern.

Fifth edition
Publication of the fifth edition began in 2008 and is being published in 103 volumes. It will have a new title scheme, a new updating service, and improved integration of European law. New titles for the fifth edition include, Sports Law, Information Technology Law, Financial Services and Institutions, Judicial Review and Environmental Quality and Public Health.

Halsbury Legal Awards
The Halsbury Legal Awards debuted in 2013.  They celebrate the value that people in law bring to society. The theme of the awards is: "The Whole of the law. Connected".

The awards recognise the achievements and talents of individuals and teams across the entire legal sector. The Bar, legal practice, in-house counsel, academia and legal journalism are all recognised, as are contribution to the promotion, growth and value of the sector.

Halsbury Awards
The Halsbury Awards, in association with the British and Irish Association of Law Librarians, were sponsored by Halsbury's Laws from 2007 to 2012. They recognise outstanding performance given by legal information services, law libraries and teams managing legal collections and resources.

Related publications
Halsbury's Laws of Australia
Halsbury's Laws of Canada
Halsbury's Laws of Singapore
Halsbury's Laws of Malaysia
Halsbury's Laws of Hong Kong
Halsbury's Laws of India
Halsbury's Laws of New Zealand
The Laws of Scotland: Stair Memorial Encyclopaedia

See also
Halsbury's Statutes
Halsbury's Statutory Instruments
Is it in Force?
Destination Tables
LexisNexis Butterworths

Bibliography
Marke, J J. A Catalogue of the Law Collection at New York University. New York University. 1953.

External links

 Volume I - 1907 - Action to Bankers and Banking
 Volume II - 1908 - Bankruptcy and Insolvency to Bills of Exchange
 Volume III - 1908 - Bills of Sale to Burial and Cremation
 Volume IV - 1908 - Carriers to Commons and Rights of Common
 Volume V - 1910 - Companies
 Volume VI - 1909 - Compulsory Purchase of Land and Compensation to Constitutional Law (Parts I - V)
 Volume VII - 1909 - Constitutional Law (Part VI to End) to Contract
 Volume VIII - 1909 - Copyholds to County Court
 Volume IX - 1909 - Courts to Criminal Law and Procedure
 Volume X - 1909 - Crown Practice to Dependencies and Colonies
 Volume XI - 1910 - Descent and Distribution to Ecclesiastical Law
 Volume XII - 1910 - Education to Electric Lighting and Power
 Volume XIII - 1910 - Equity to Evidence
 Volume XIV - 1910 - Execution to Fisheries
 Volume XV - 1911 - Food and Drugs to Guarantee
 Volume XVI - 1911 - Highways, Streets, and Bridges to Income Tax
 Volume XVII - 1911 - Industrial, Provident and Similar Societies to Interpleader
 Volume XVIII - 1911 - Intoxicating Liquors to Libel and Slander
 Volume XIX - 1911 - Lien to Malicious Prosecution and Procedure
 Volume XX - 1911 - Markets and Fairs to Misrepresentation and Fraud
 Volume XXI - 1912 - Mistake to Partition
 Volume XXII - 1912 - Partnership to Post Office
 Volume XXIII - 1912 - Powers to Railways and Canals
 Volume XXIV - 1912 - Rates and Rating to Revenue
 Volume XXV - 1913 - Royal Forces to Sheriffs and Bailiffs
 Volume XXVI - 1914 - Shipping and Navigation to Solicitors
 Volume XXVII - 1913 - Specific Performance to Trover and Detinue
 Volume XXVIII - 1914 - Trusts and Trustees to Work and Labour
 Volume XXIX - 1915 - Consolidated Table of Cases
 Volume XXX - 1917 - General Index - A-L
 Volume XXXI - 1917 - General Index - M-Z
 Supplement No. 21 - 1931 - Bringing the Work up to 1931

References

English law
Encyclopedias of law
British encyclopedias
1907 non-fiction books
1932 non-fiction books
1952 non-fiction books
1973 non-fiction books
2008 non-fiction books
20th-century encyclopedias
21st-century encyclopedias